Progestogen-only injectable contraceptives (POICs) are a form of hormonal contraception and progestogen-only contraception that are administered by injection and providing long-lasting birth control. As opposed to combined injectable contraceptives, they contain only a progestogen without an estrogen, and include two progestin preparations:

 Medroxyprogesterone acetate (brand names Depo-Provera, Provera, Depo-subQ Provera 104) – 150 mg (intramuscularly) or 104 mg (subcutaneously) every 3 months
 Norethisterone enanthate (brand names NET EN, Noristerat, Norigest, Doryxas) – 200 mg (intramuscularly) every 2 months

Research
Progestogens that have been studied for potential use as POICs but were never marketed as such include the progesterone derivatives algestone acetophenide (dihydroxyprogesterone acetophenide) (100 mg/month), chlormadinone acetate (250 mg/3 months), hydroxyprogesterone caproate (250–500 mg/month), gestonorone caproate (2.5–200 mg/1–2 months), and oxogestone phenpropionate (50–75 mg/month), and the testosterone derivatives lynestrenol phenylpropionate (25–75 mg/month), levonorgestrel butanoate, levonorgestrel cyclobutylcarboxylate, and levonorgestrel cyclopropylcarboxylate. Some of these have been introduced for use in combined injectable contraceptives instead.

See also
 Combined oral contraceptive pill
 Progestogen-only pill

References

Hormonal contraception
Progestogens